Ignacy Krzyżanowski (December 24, 1826 in Opatów - February 10, 1905) was a Polish composer.

References

External links

Ignacy Krzyżanowski, Biography at Opatów Town Page
Ignacy Krzyżanowski, PWN Encyklopedia
Ignacy Krzyżanowski, Encyklopedia Interia
 Scores  by Ignacy Krzyżanowski in digital library Polona

1826 births
1905 deaths
Polish classical composers